Maty Huitrón (30 January 1936 - 14 January 2019), known artistically as Martina Güitrón Porto, was a Mexican actress. She worked with the most important figures of the time, such as Cantinflas, Joaquín Pardavé and Fernando Soler.

Career 
Huitrón made her theatrical debut with the play Yo Colón, starring Mario Moreno "Cantinflas", and with which the Teatro de los Insurgentes was inaugurated on 30 April 1953. Although the play was not well received, that same year Maty became an icon in Mexico after she was photographed on Madero Street in Mexico City by photojournalist Nacho Lopez.

Huitrón had a long career as an actress and would go on to star in films such as Mi papá tuvo la culpa, Mariquita de mi corazón and "El casto Susano". She was also known for her roles in telenovelas such as El privilegio de amar and Amor Real both produced by her daughter Carla Estrada.

She was president of the Casa del Actor, a home for retired Mexican actors, founded by Cantinflas.

Huitrón retired from the stage in 2014 due to health problems.

Personal life 
Huitrón was married to journalist Carlos Silvestre Estrada Lang for 34 years until his death in 2016 at the age of 100. She had three children, María Mar, Rocío, and renowned telenovela producer Carla Estrada.

Death 
Huitrón died on 14 January 2019 at the age of 82. She had been suffering respiratory problems for many years as a result of decades of smoking.

A number of entertainers paid their tributes to the late actress, including Lucero, Emilio Larrosa, Jorge Ortiz de Pinero, Sergio Mayer, Daniela Romo, Victoria Ruffo and Erika Buenfil.

External links

References 

1936 births
2019 deaths
Place of birth missing
20th-century Mexican actresses
21st-century Mexican actresses
Mexican film actresses
Mexican stage actresses
Mexican telenovela actresses